Francesco Panigarola (6 February 1548 – 31 May 1594) was an Italian Franciscan preacher and controversialist, and Bishop of Asti.

Life
Panigarola was born at Milan.  As a student of law at Pavia and Bologna he led a dissipated life; he then entered the Order of Friars Minor at Florence, 15 March 1567. At the age of twenty-three he was sent to Rome, where his sermons attracted much attention.

Pope Pius V had him sent to Paris where for two years he studied the Church Fathers and the Councils, Greek and Hebrew. Returning to Italy he preached during thirteen years in the principal towns. He converted many Calvinists in France and Savoy; at Naples there was collected, through one of his sermons, enough money to build a hospital for incurables. He also assisted in the construction of the Italian church of Antwerp, and of the Franciscan buildings at Genoa, Venice, Milan, and Turin.

During his lifetime Panigarola was known for his prodigious memory; through diligent practice of the memory palace system, he had allegedly accumulated a mental collection of more than one hundred thousand memory images.

In 1579 Panigarola attended, as custos of his province, the general chapter at Paris. Finally in 1586 Pope Sixtus V appointed him titular Bishop and Coadjutor of Ferrara, whence in 1587 he was transferred to the See of Asti. Shortly after he was sent to France as assistant to the papal legate, Cardinal Henry Cajetan. When Henry IV of France had renounced Calvinism, the bishop returned to Asti, where he died.

Works

Stanislao Melchiorri (Annales Min. cont. XXIII ad a. 1594, n. 76-81) gives the most complete catalogue of Panigarola's works. The most important are:
 "Il Compendio degli Annali ecclesiastici del Padre Cesare Baronio", Rome, 1590; 2nd ed., Venice, 1593, comprises only the first volume of the Annales Ecclesiastici of Baronius.
 "B. Petri Apostolorum Principis Gesta ... in rapsodiæ, quam catenam appellant, speciem disposita", Asti, 1591.
 "Lettioni sopra dogmi, dette Calviniche", Venice, 1584. This work, translated into Latin (Milan, 1594), was attacked by Giacomo Picenino in "Apologia per i Riformatori e per la Religione Riformata contro le Invettive di F. Panigarola e P. Segneri ", Coira, 1706.
 "Il Predicatore di F. Francesco Panigarola ... overo Parafrase, comento e discorsi intorno al libro dell' Elocutione di Demetrio Falerco ...", Venice, 1609.
 "Specchio di Guerra"

He also wrote commentaries (Psalms, Jeremias etc.) and many collections of sermons, published in Italian and Latin. His sermons were translated in French too.

References

Attribution
  The entry cites:
 Luke Wadding, Scriptores Ord. Min. (Rome, 1806), 87-89 (Rome, 1906), 88-90;
 Sbaralea, Supplementum ad Script. (Rome, 1806), 176-78, (Rome, 1908), 292-94;
 Rodulphius Tossinianensis, Historiarum Seraphicae Religionis libri tres (Venice, 1586), fol. 317;
 Ferdinando Ughelli, Italia Sacra, IV (2nd ed., Venice, 1719), 401-02;
 Boatteri, Serie cronologico-storica de' Vescovi della Chiesa d'Asti (Asti, 1807), 110-14;
 Girolamo Tiraboschi, Storia della Letteratura italiana, VII (Rome, 1785), iii, 424-29; VII (Rome, 1784), i, 366;
 Melchiorri, Annales Minorum Wadd. cont., XXIII (Ancona, 1859), 157-64, ad an. 1594, n. 57-84;
 Marcellino da Civezza, Storia Universale delle Missioni Francescane, VII (Prato, 1883), i, 436-49.

Further reading 
 

1548 births
1594 deaths
Italian Friars Minor
Bishops of Asti
16th-century Italian Roman Catholic bishops